The Luiseño or Payómkawichum are an indigenous people of California who, at the time of the first contacts with the Spanish in the 16th century, inhabited the coastal area of southern California, ranging  from the present-day southern part of Los Angeles County to the northern part of San Diego County, and inland . In the Luiseño language, the people call themselves Payómkawichum (also spelled Payómkowishum), meaning "People of the West." After the establishment of Mission San Luis Rey de Francia (The Mission of Saint Louis King of France), "the Payómkawichum began to be called San Luiseños, and later, just Luiseños by Spanish missionaries due to their proximity to this San Luis Rey mission.

Today there are six federally recognized tribes of Luiseño bands based in southern California, all with reservations. Another organized band is not federally recognized.

History

Pre-colonization 
The Payómkawichum were successful in utilizing a number of natural resources to provide food and clothing. They had a close relationship with their natural environment. They used many of the native plants, harvesting many kinds of seeds, berries, nuts, fruits, and vegetables for a varied and nutritious diet. The land also was inhabited by many different species of animals which the men hunted for game and skins. Hunters took antelopes, bobcats, deer, elk, foxes, mice, mountain lions, rabbits, wood rats, river otters, ground squirrels, and a wide variety of insects. The Luiseño used toxins leached from the California buckeye to stupefy fish in order to harvest them in mountain creeks.

Estimates for the pre-contact populations of most native groups in California have varied substantially. In the 1920s, A. L. Kroeber put the 1770 population of the Luiseño (including the Juaneño) at 4,000–5,000; he estimated the population in 1910 as 500. The historian Raymond C. White proposed a historic population of 10,000 in his work of the 1960s. Pablo Tac, born in 1820, recorded, "perhaps from oral history and official records" that approximately five thousand people were living in Payómkawichum territory prior to the arrival of the Spanish.

Mission period 
The first Spanish missions were established in California in 1769. For nearly 30 years, Payómkawichum "who lived in the autonomous territories on the mesas and coastal valleys" in the western region of their traditional territory, "witnessed the constant incursion of caravans that moved north and south through their land on El Camino Real."

Spanish missionaries established Mission San Luis Rey de Francia entirely within the borders of Payómkawichum territory in 1798. Known as the "King of the Missions," it was founded on June 13, 1798, by Father Fermín Francisco de Lasuén, located in what is now Oceanside, California, in northern San Diego County. It was the Spanish First Military District.

Mexican period 
The Mexican Empire assumed ownership of Payómkawichum lands after defeating Spain in the Mexican War of Independence in 1821. The following year, Mexican troops confiscated all coastal lands from the Payómkawichum in 1822, granting much of the land to Mexican settlers, who became known as Californios, to develop the land for agriculture.

Mexican-American War 

The Payómkawichum did not actively participate in the war, but fell victim to the violence following the Battle of San Pasqual. Eleven Californio lancers from the battle arrived at Rancho Pauma and stole horses from the Pauma Band of the Luiseno. The Pauma Band apprehended the thieves and sought to punish them and initially let them off with a warning. However, an American present at the trial successfully convinced the Luiseño to execute them, leading to the execution of all Californio thieves known to the Californios as the Pauma Massacre.

News of the execution reached the Mexican General José María Flores in Los Ángeles, he sent a Mexican force under José del Carmen Lugo in retaliation to execute the chiefs responsible for executing the Californios. Along the way Lugo met with a group of Cahuilla led by Cooswootna (Juan Antonio), who decided to join forces to attack their Payómkawichum rival. News of the advance reached Temecula, leading the Payómkawichum to hide in the nearby caves and canyons. The allied forces took the high ground on the meadows and the Payómkawichum troops charged up the hill to meet them, leading to the Temecula massacre. The battle killed over 100 Temecula Payómkawichum and the Payómkawichum were defeated. The captured soldiers were handed over to the Cahuilla, who executed all of the prisoners. The Mormon Battalion later reached Temecula and allowed the survivors to bury their dead.

American period 
After the war, Payómkawichum leaders entered negotiations to sign the Treaty of Temecula and Treaty of San Louis Rey to protect their lands, but the treaties remained unratified. After the admission of the State of California, the state allowed White Americans to impose indentured servitude on Indigenous Californians under the Act for the Governance and Protection of Indians.In 1875, President Ulysses S. Grant allowed reservations to be established in the area. That same year, the state of California evicted the Payómkawichum in the Temecula Valley to be redistributed to American ranchers. In 1882, another round of reservations was permitted to be established under President Chester A. Arthur after the details of the Temecula eviction scheme were revealed.Boarding school programs were established to assimilate the Payómkawichum into subservience and American culture, whose children were enrolled into the Sherman Indian School in Riverside. The Pauma, Pala, and Rincon Bands sued for the right to enroll their children at local schools.

Gems were discovered around the Pala Reservation in the 1890s, extracting pink tourmaline, pegmatite, and morganite beryl (the latter being the first discovery of the gem of its kind). Pink tourmaline quickly became the top export as Dowager Empress Cixi of the Qing dynasty spoke highly of the gem in 1902, which became the tribe's main export until 1911 when the Dowager died.

The Payómkawichum were allowed to pursue gambling operations on their reservations after its legalization in the 1980s, which allowed them to establish several casinos in their reservations in the 2000s, including but not limited to the Pala Casino Resort and Spa (2000), Pechanga Resort & Casino (2002), and Harrah's Resort Southern California (2004). This newfound wealth also allowed the Pechanga Band to purchase the naming rights to the San Diego Sports Arena, now known as Pechanga Arena.

During the October 2007 California wildfires, the Poomacha Fire ravaged the La Jolla Indian Reservation, destroying 92% of the reservation. State and federal agencies provided aid to rebuild the tribe's facilities and residents of the tribe were able to return to the reservation by the end of the next year.

Language 

The Luiseño language belongs to the Cupan group of Takic languages, within the major Uto-Aztecan family of languages. About 30 to 40 people speak the language. In some of the independent bands, individuals are studying the language, language preservation materials are being compiled, and singers sing traditional songs in the language. Pablo Tac, born at San Luis Rey in 1822, devised a written form of Luiseño language through "his study of Latin grammar and Spanish" while working "among international scholars in Rome." Although Tac had to conform to "Latin grammatical constructions, his word choice and his narrative form, along with his continual translation between Luiseño and Spanish, establish an Indigenous framework for understanding Luiseño."

Bands 

Today Luiseño people are enrolled in the following recognized tribes and one unrecognized tribe:

Villages

Riverside County 

 'áaway, on a head branch of Santa Margarita River
 Awa’, Aguanga
 Chawimai, Los Duraznos, Cahuilla valley
 Hurúmpa, west of Riverside
 Méexa, on Santa Margarita River northwest of Temecula
 Pawi, warm spring in middle of village at Cahuilla valley
 Páayaxchi, on Elsinore Lake
 Pichaang, Pechanga
 Șuvóowu Șuvóova, east of San Jacinto Soboba
 Táa'akwi, at the head of Santa Margarita River
 Teméeku, east of Temecula

San Diego County 
'ahúuya, near the upper course of San Luis Rey River
 'akíipa, near Kahpa
 'áalapi, San Pascual south of the middle course of the San Luis Rey River
 Húyyulkum, on the upper course of San Luis Rey River
 'ikáymay, near San Luis Rey Mission
 Qáxpa, on the middle course of San Luis Rey River
 Katúktu, between Santa Margarita and San Luis Rey Rivers, north of San Luis Rey
 Qée'ish, Qéch, south of San Luis Rey Mission
 Qewéw, on the upper course of San Luis Rey River
 Kóolu, near the upper course of San Luis Rey River
 Kúuki, on the upper course of San Luis Rey River
 Kwáa'alam, on the lower course of San Luis Rey River
 Maláamay, northeast of Pala
 Mixéelum pompáwvo, near Escondido
 Ngóoriva
 Pa'áa'aw, near Tái Palomar mountain
 Páala, at Pala
 Páalimay, on the coast between Buena Vista and Agua Hedionda Creeks, Carlsbad
 Panakare, north of Escondido
 Páașuku, near the headwaters of San Luis Rey River
 Páawma, east of Pala Pauma
 Pochóorivo, on the upper course of San Luis Rey River
 Sóowmay, south of the middle course of San Luis Rey River
 Șakíshmay (Luiseño or Diegueño), on the boundary line between the two peoples
 Șíikapa, Palomar, west of Escondido
 Táaxanashpa, La Jolla
 Táakwish poșáppila, east of Palomar Mountain
 Tá'i, close to Palomar Mountain
 Tapá'may, north of Katúktu
 Tómqav, west of Pala
 'úshmay, at Las Flores
 Waxáwmay, Guajome on San Luis Rey River above San Luis Rey
 Wiyóoya, at the mouth of San Luis Rey River
 Wi'áasamay, east of San Luis Rey
 Wáșxa, Rincon near the upper course of San Luis Rey River
 Yamí', near Húyyulkum

Notable Luiseños
 Pete Calac (1892–1968), football player
 Freddy Herrera, musician
 James Luna (1950–2018), performance artist
 Jamie Okuma (b. 1977), beadwork artist, fashion designer
 Fritz Scholder (1937–2005), painter and sculptor
 Ruth-Ann Thorn (b. 1965), art dealer, documentary film maker
 Pablo Tac (1822–1841), scholar

See also 
 Luiseño language
 Luiseño traditional narratives
 Mission Indians
 Pauma Massacre
 Temecula Massacre
 USS Luiseno (ATF-156)
 Kumeyaay people

References 
Citations

Works cited

Further reading 
 Bean, Lowell John and Shipek, Florence C. (1978) "Luiseño," in California, ed. Robert F. Heizer, vol. 8, Handbook of North American Indians (Washington, D.C.: Smithsonian Institution, pp. 550–563.
 Du Bois, Constance Goddard. 1904–1906. "Mythology of the Mission Indians: The Mythology of the Luiseño and Diegueño Indians of Southern California", in The Journal of the American Folk-Lore Society, Vol. XVII, No. LXVI. pp. 185–8 [1904]; Vol. XIX. No. LXXII pp. 52–60 and LXXIII. pp. 145–64. [1906].
 
  Volume 2

External links 

 Soboba Band of Luiseño Indians official site
 Pechanga Band of Luiseño Indians
 Mythology of the Mission Indians, by Du Bois, 1904–1906.
 San Luis Rey Band of Luiseño Indians official site 
 

 
 
California Mission Indians
Native American tribes in California
Native American tribes in Riverside County, California
Native American tribes in San Diego County, California
History of San Diego County, California